Sir David Arthur Roberts, KBE, CMG, CVO (8 August 1924 – 7 June 1987) was a British career diplomat who was ambassador to Lebanon, Syria and the United Arab Emirates.

Career
David Roberts was educated at Hereford Cathedral School and Jesus College, Oxford. After wartime service in the Royal Armoured Corps he joined the Diplomatic Service in 1947. He served in Baghdad, Tokyo, Alexandria, Khartoum, Dakar, Damascus and Dubai, with some intervening posts in London, before being appointed High Commissioner to Barbados in 1971. Roberts was Ambassador to Syria 1973–76; High Commissioner to Sierra Leone 1976–77; Ambassador to the United Arab Emirates 1977–81; and Ambassador to Lebanon 1981–83. He was knighted in the New Year Honours in 1983 and was director-general of the Middle East Association 1983–85. In 1985 he was appointed an Honorary Fellow of the Centre for Middle Eastern and Islamic Studies at Durham University.

Sir David was chairman of Herefordshire District Health Authority from 1986 until his death.

Publications

 The Ba'th and the Creation of Modern Syria, Palgrave, 1987.

References

ROBERTS, Sir David (Arthur), Who Was Who, A & C Black, 1920–2008; online edn, Oxford University Press, Dec 2007, accessed 14 Feb 2012

Alumni of Jesus College, Oxford
Ambassadors of the United Kingdom to Lebanon
Ambassadors of the United Kingdom to Syria
Ambassadors of the United Kingdom to the United Arab Emirates
Commanders of the Royal Victorian Order
Companions of the Order of St Michael and St George
High Commissioners of the United Kingdom to Barbados
High Commissioners of the United Kingdom to Sierra Leone
Knights Commander of the Order of the British Empire
1924 births
1987 deaths
People educated at Hereford Cathedral School
British Army personnel of World War II
Royal Armoured Corps soldiers
British expatriates in Iraq
British expatriates in Japan
British expatriates in Egypt
British expatriates in Sudan
British expatriates in Senegal